Richmond, Virginia, held a general election on November 3, 2020. Voters elected the Mayor of Richmond, Virginia, members of the Richmond City Council, as well as several other local officials. The incumbent, Levar Stoney, who was elected in 2016 ran for reelection facing five challengers. While local races in Virginia are officially nonpartisan elections, four candidates (Stoney, Gray, Rodgers, and McLean) identified with the Democratic party while Griffin ran as an independent. Stoney won the most votes in six out of nine city council districts and therefore won reelection. In order to win election a candidate must receive the most votes in five or more districts.

Background 
Incumbent Democrat Levar Stoney was eligible to seek re-election. The election was the fifth citywide election for mayor through popular vote. The election is nonpartisan meaning no candidate can be affiliated with any party on the ticket.

Leading up to the election, the incumbent mayor, Stoney, had received criticism for his handling of the Navy Hill project, along with the COVID-19 pandemic, and his handling of the George Floyd protests.

In his reelection campaign, Stoney championed his accomplishments during the first four years in office, including a halt on evictions during the COVID-19 pandemic, free eyeglasses for students in Richmond Public Schools, and increased RPS funding. Stoney also noted his accomplishments of public transportation, such as the opening of the GRTC Pulse transit line, which opened during his second year as mayor.

Challenger Justin Griffin ran a campaign premised on the idea that the residents of Richmond deserved better than they got from the city government. His campaign used the slogan "We Deserve Better." His top discussed issues are "better schools, better roads, better city services."

Candidates

Declared 
 Kimberly Gray, 2nd District City Councilwoman
 Justin Griffin, Small Business Attorney
 Tracey McLean, small business owner
 Alexsis Rodgers, National Domestic Workers Alliance state director and former policy director of Ralph Northam
 Levar Stoney, incumbent Mayor

Withdrawn 
 Michael Gilbert, economics professor at VCU (withdrew on September 15)

Endorsements

Polling

Results

Notes 

Partisan clients

References 

2020 Virginia elections
2020 United States mayoral elections
November 2020 events in the United States
2020
Mayoral election